Viterbo is a town and municipality in the Colombian Department of Caldas. Formally constituted as a municipality on December 31, 1951, it was founded on April 19, 1911 by Presbítero Nazario Restrepo Botero.  The current mayor is Jhon Mario Giraldo Arrubla.
They call it "El Paraiso Turistico de Caldas" (The Touristic Paradise of The Colombian Department of Caldas. It is known as this due to its all year through warm climate, Villas, Farms and Condominiums around the surrounding land, and the welcoming people of the 'Viterbeños' (Viterbo People).

Location
The town is situated between the Risaralda River Valley and  the foothills of the Cordillera Occidental. It is close to the city of Pereira and near three other cities, Manizales, Cali and Medellín. These cities are connected by good, easy to travel roads. It also has nearby air connections: Matecaña International airport in Pereira and Santa Ana international airport near Cartago. It is also known as "El Paraíso de Caldas" (the paradise of Caldas) due to the beautiful landscape, the notable condos surrounding it, wide streets and recreational facilities.

Local Economy
The local economy of Viterbo is based largely around agriculture and farming, with principal exports including sugarcane, corn, citrus, tropical fruit and some coffee. There is also an  emerging tourism industry with the boom in vacationing condos construction

External links
Viterbo tourism (domain appears to be for sale as of November 20, 2010)
 Official site
 www.tuviterbo.com

References

Municipalities of Caldas Department
Populated places established in 1911